Heinfels is a municipality in the district of Lienz in the Austrian state of Tyrol. It is most known as the site of Burg Heinfels.

Population

References

External links
Tyrol.tl. "Heinfels" http://www.tyrol.tl/en/tyrols-holiday-areas/hochpustertal-east-tyrol/heinfels.html

Cities and towns in Lienz District